From January 3 to June 3, 2008, voters of the Republican Party chose their nominee for president in the 2008 United States presidential election. Senator John McCain of Arizona was selected as the nominee through a series of primary elections and caucuses culminating in the 2008 Republican National Convention held from Monday, September 1, through Thursday, September 4, 2008, in Saint Paul, Minnesota. President George W. Bush was ineligible to be elected to a third term due to the term limits established by the 22nd Amendment.

In a crowded primary of several prominent Republicans eyeing the nomination, former New York City mayor Rudy Giuliani was the early frontrunner. However, former Arkansas Governor Mike Huckabee won the Iowa Caucuses as he gained momentum just two months prior to the primary. Moderate U.S. Senator and former presidential candidate John McCain won the New Hampshire and Florida primaries. After failing to win in Florida, Giuliani ended his campaign.

McCain ultimately won the nomination after winning most of the primaries on Super Tuesday. He was officially nominated at the 2008 Republican National Convention on September 4, 2008, but went on to lose the general election to Barack Obama.

Candidates 

Notes for the following table: Delegate counts is the final estimated delegate count.

Nominee 
The vast majority of primaries were of the "winner-take-all" variety, and convention rules meant that no one with less than five states in their "pockets" would be allowed to have their names placed in nomination. This guaranteed that the primary season would be very short. McCain won New Hampshire, South Carolina and Florida and thus became nearly unstoppable. After decisive victories on super Tuesday and the potomac primary McCain became the presumptive nominee. Candidates are listed by delegate counts.

Withdrew before primaries

Calendar 

Republican candidates in the 2008 U.S. presidential election campaigned for the nomination of their party in a series of primary elections and caucus events.

Unlike the Democratic Party, which mandates a proportional representation for delegate selection, the Republican Party has no such limitation. For states with primaries, some states choose to use the "winner-take-all" method to allocate delegates within a state, while others do winner-take-all within a specific congressional district, and still others use the proportional process. Unlike the Democratic Party, state party by-laws determine whether each delegate is pledged and for how long the delegate is pledged.

In caucus states, most state parties use a two pronged process. A straw poll, often called a presidential preference poll, is conducted of the attendees at the caucus. The results are released to the media and published on the state party website. Delegates are then elected to the county conventions. It is at the county conventions that delegates are elected to state conventions, and from the state convention to the national convention. At each level, delegates may be bound or unbound to a candidate. If unbound, delegates are not obligated to follow the results of the presidential preference poll. Thus, all estimates of delegates from caucus states are dependent on state party by-laws.

Campaign

2007 
With Vice President Dick Cheney choosing not to seek the nomination, making this election the first time since 1952 that neither the current President or Vice President was a candidate, and Secretary of State Condoleezza Rice ruling herself out, the race for the 2008 presidential nomination was wide open. It officially began in March 2006 when John H. Cox became the first candidate to enter the 2008 race. The Democratic takeover of both houses of Congress and President Bush's unpopularity were strong issues for the GOP field. At the beginning of 2007, the announced Republican field was former Governor of Wisconsin and Cabinet member Tommy Thompson, former Governor of Virginia Jim Gilmore, and Senator of Kansas Sam Brownback. Former senator of Virginia George Allen was considered a top contender until his loss in the midterm elections. He announced on December 10, 2006, that he would not seek the 2008 nomination. In early January former Governor of Massachusetts Mitt Romney announced he was forming an exploratory committee. Afterwards several others announced they were running, including U.S. Congressman Ron Paul, Mike Huckabee of Arkansas, Rudy Giuliani of New York City, U.S. Senator John McCain, U.S. Congressman Duncan Hunter, and U.S. Congressman Tom Tancredo. A poll released in early February had Giuliani leading with 32% and John McCain second with 18%. By early March, Giuliani had become the frontrunner. Alan Keyes and former Senator and actor Fred Thompson entered the race later in September.

The first to drop out of the race was former Virginia Governor Jim Gilmore in July. After that Tommy Thompson also dropped out in August after finishing sixth in the Ames Iowa straw poll. Then pro-life advocate Sam Brownback dropped out of the race in October. In December, staunch illegal-immigration opponent Tom Tancredo and businessman John H. Cox also left the race.

Iowa and New Hampshire 

On January 3, 2008, the Iowa caucuses began. The final averaged polling results from Real Clear Politics showed Mike Huckabee at 30%, Romney at 27%, McCain and Thompson tied at 12%, Paul at 7%, and Giuliani at 6%. Among those surveyed in Exit Polling data, 45% cited themselves as very conservative and voted for Huckabee 35% to Romney's 23% and Thompson's 22%. Among those who called themselves "somewhat conservative" (43%), Huckabee won 34% to Romney's 27% and McCain's 18%.

Final Results showed Huckabee swept much of the state with the exception of the western and eastern portions of the state which included Davenport, Cedar Rapids, as well as Sioux City. Romney swept the eastern and western portions of the state and Paul took one southern county. The final results in Iowa were Huckabee with 34%, Romney with 25%, Thompson and McCain each with 13%, Paul with 10% and Giuliani with 4%.

In the New Hampshire Primary, both McCain and Romney had gambled much on the state. McCain had staked much on his grassroots efforts in the state he won in 2000, as well as the state with one of the most independent voting blocks which was McCain's strong suit. Romney, coming from neighboring Massachusetts was known by many in New Hampshire and even owned a home in the state of New Hampshire. Pre-Primary polling showed McCain with a slight edge (32–28%) with Huckabee leading Giuliani for third (12–9%).

On Primary night, McCain won 37–32% and Huckabee beat Giuliani for third 11–9%. After the results, Huckabee decided to focus on the South Carolina primary, while both McCain and Romney went to Michigan where polls showed a competitive race between the two.

Michigan 
With different winners in Iowa and New Hampshire – and Mitt Romney taking the lower-profile Wyoming caucus – the January 15 Michigan primary loomed as an important battle. Polls after New Hampshire showed a tight race between McCain and Romney, with Huckabee a close third. Many saw Michigan as Romney's last chance for a campaign-saving win after disappointments in the first two races. Others said that a win in Michigan could cement McCain's status as the "front-runner" for the nomination. McCain's campaign garnered about $1 million in newly contributed funds immediately after the New Hampshire win, but still had $3.5 million in bank debt.

Nevertheless, some polls showed McCain getting a significant national bounce from his New Hampshire win; the January 11 CNN nationwide poll had him at 34 percent support, a 21-point increase from where he had been just a month before, and a significant lead over Huckabee (21 percent) and Giuliani (18 percent). As the Michigan race entered its final days, McCain gained some notoriety by sending out mailers there and in South Carolina attacking Romney's tax record and touting his own. A Romney campaign spokesman called the ad "as sloppy as it is factually incorrect", and FactCheck.org called the piece "misleading." McCain responded by saying, "It's not negative campaigning. I think it's what his record is." "It's a tough business," he added.

The dominant issue in Michigan was the state of the economy. Michigan had by far the nation's largest unemployment rate, at 7.4 percent, and was continuing to lose jobs from its historical manufacturing base. McCain offered a bit of his "straight talk", saying that "There are some jobs that aren't coming back to Michigan," and proposing federal job training plans and other remedies to compensate. Romney seized on McCain's statement as overly pessimistic and promoted instead his family heritage – "[I've] got the automobile industry in my blood veins" – as well as his being a Washington outsider who would go there and "turn Washington inside out."

In the end, McCain finished second in the primary behind Romney, gaining 30 percent of the vote to Romney's 39 percent.

Nevada and South Carolina 
Mitt Romney was heavily favored to win Nevada, leading 34% to 19% in polls. He exceeded expectations, earning 51% of the vote with Ron Paul beating out John McCain for second. Romney campaigned hard in Nevada and did not campaign in South Carolina, while the other leading Republican candidates, John McCain and Mike Huckabee, kept their focus on South Carolina. Nevada was not subject to the Republican party cutting in half the number of delegates the state can send to the national convention, and neither was South Carolina. However, Nevada had more delegates at stake than South Carolina. A win in Nevada extended Romney's lead in total delegates. Nevada's large Mormon population helped Romney win the state.

After coming last in this caucus, Duncan Hunter withdrew his bid for the nomination.
Mike Huckabee needed to win South Carolina for his campaign to remain viable. RealClearPolitics reported that the average support from polls placed McCain in the lead with 27%, followed by Huckabee with 25%, Romney with 15%, Thompson with 15%, Paul with 4%, and Giuliani with 3%. Thompson started attacking Mike Huckabee heavily, questioning his conservative credentials. But in the end McCain narrowly won by 14,743 or 3%, putting McCain as the frontrunner in Florida. Fred Thompson only placed third, even though he had started to campaign in South Carolina immediately after Iowa and before the other candidates had started campaigning there. He withdrew the next day.

Florida 
Rudy Giuliani campaigned heavily in Florida, which he expected to use as his "launch pad" for a "strong showing" on Super Tuesday. He campaigned almost entirely in Florida, and largely ignored South Carolina and other states voting before February 5. Polls taken before the primary showed that John McCain was the slight front runner over Mitt Romney. Giuliani had been campaigning with virtually no opposition; however, following the South Carolina Republican primary, 2008, several candidates flew down to Florida to begin campaigning up to January 29 when the primary occurred. RealClearPolitics reported that the average support from polls taken in the days immediately prior to primary day placed McCain slightly in the lead with 31%, followed by Romney with 30%, Giuliani with 15%, Huckabee with 13%, and Paul with 4%. Former Senator Fred Thompson and Rep. Duncan Hunter, though already out of the race, still remained on the ballot in the Florida primary.

McCain was able to ride a last-minute endorsement by then-Republican Governor Charlie Crist to a five-point victory on January 29. He took all 57 delegates in Florida's winner-take-all contest. (The state's delegate total had been reduced by half due to RNC rules about primaries held before February 5.) Giuliani, having banked heavily on Florida, ended his campaign the following day.

Super Tuesday 

On January 31 McCain received the endorsement of California Governor Arnold Schwarzenegger and began campaigning with him. This was a key endorsement, as California was one of the Super Tuesday states and had more delegates than any other state. The same day, Governor Rick Perry of Texas threw his support behind McCain. Perry had previously been a Giuliani supporter, while Schwarzenegger had refrained from endorsing either McCain or Giuliani because he counted both men as friends. Meanwhile, Romney, still burning about McCain's Iraq withdrawal timetable charge, compared McCain to disgraced former President Richard Nixon, saying that McCain's claim was "reminiscent of the Nixon era" and that "I don't think I want to see our party go back to that kind of campaigning."

McCain won his home state of Arizona, taking all 53 of the state's delegates and the largest of the Super Tuesday prizes, winning nearly all of California's 173 delegates. McCain also scored wins in Connecticut, Delaware, Illinois, Missouri, New Jersey, New York and Oklahoma. Huckabee also made surprise wins in states he had polled behind in previously like Georgia, Alabama, and Tennessee. Huckabee also won the first contest of Super Tuesday in West Virginia. Romney won his home state of Massachusetts. He also won Utah, Colorado, and Minnesota.

The next day, McCain appeared confident that he would be the Republican nominee. Estimates showed him with 707 delegates – nearly 60% of the total needed to win the nomination. He began to appeal to disaffected conservatives, saying: "We share the common principles and values and ideas for the future of this country based on a fundamental conservative political philosophy, which has been my record." He also suggested that the right wing of the party "calm down a little bit" and begin to look for areas of agreement. Meanwhile, Romney advisers privately expressed doubts about whether their candidate could realistically hope to defeat McCain, and it was unclear if Romney would spend significant money on key February 12 contests in Virginia and Maryland.

Later February contests 
Both McCain and Romney addressed the Conservative Political Action Conference (CPAC) in Washington, DC on February 7, while Mike Huckabee spoke on February 9. Romney used his speech to announce the end of his campaign, saying, "Now if I fight on in my campaign, all the way to the convention – (cheers, applause). I want you to know I've given this a lot of thought. I'd forestall the launch of a national campaign and, frankly, I'd be making it easier for Senator Clinton or Obama to win. Frankly, in this time of war, I simply cannot let my campaign be a part of aiding a surrender to terror." McCain spoke about an hour later, again appealing to right-wing uncertainty about his ideology.

He focused on his opposition to abortion and gun control, as well as his support for lower taxes and free-market health care solutions. He told the CPAC audience that he arrived in Washington as "a foot soldier in the Reagan Revolution", and addressed the issue of illegal immigration – one of the major issues where conservatives have attacked McCain. He said that "it would be among my highest priorities to secure our borders first", before addressing other immigration laws. Mike Huckabee spoke to CPAC two days later and said, "I know that there was some speculation that I might come here today to announce that I would be getting out of the race. But I want to make sure you understand. Am I quitting? Well, let's get that settled right now. No, I'm not. And the reason is simple – I never learned arithmetic. You see folks, while I didn't get a college degree in mathematics and writing, I majored in miracles. Mathematically impossible miracles. It is because I go back to that which helped crystallize in me a conservative viewpoint as a teenager when it wasn't easy or popular to be a Republican or a conservative in my hometown, because I do believe that America is about making choices, not simply echoing that of others. Let others join the "Me, too" crowd. But I didn't get where I am today and I didn't fight the battles in a state that, when I became its governor, was 90 percent Democrat, by simply echoing the voices of others. I did it by staking out a choice, stating that choice, making that choice and fighting for that choice, to believe that some things were right, some things were wrong, and it's better to be right and even to not win than it is to be wrong and to be a part of the crowd."

February 9 saw voting in Louisiana, Kansas and Washington state. Huckabee won an easy victory in Kansas, claiming all 36 of the state's delegates to the national convention. Only 14,016 votes were cast, and the McCain campaign expressed no concern over the lightly attended caucus. However, social conservatives had a strong presence in the Kansas Republican party, and the results served to highlight conservative dissatisfaction with the Senator. Louisiana was much closer, but Huckabee won there as well, beating McCain by less than one percentage point. McCain was declared the winner of the Washington caucuses, where 18 delegates were at stake. The February 19 primary would determine the other 19 delegates from the state. When McCain was declared the winner of the caucuses, with a lead of only 242 (3,468 to 3,226) over Huckabee and counting stopped with only 87% of the precincts reporting, Huckabee's campaign indicated that they would challenge the results.

Next up was the Potomac primary on February 12, with voting in Virginia, Maryland and the District of Columbia. McCain swept the three races and took all 113 delegates which were at stake.

The next day, the McCain camp released a memo calling a Huckabee win "mathematically impossible." In truth, however, it was not impossible. In fact, if Huckabee failed to reach 1191 delegates but succeeded in keeping McCain from reaching 1191, then the result would have been a brokered convention.

With the media declaring McCain the "presumptive nominee", McCain began to focus on the Democrats, particularly leading candidate Barack Obama, in anticipation of the general election.

The day after McCain's Potomac sweep, the Kansas City Star published a list of people who have been mentioned as possible McCain running mates, if he secured the nomination.

On February 14, Mitt Romney officially endorsed McCain and asked his approximately 280 delegates to support him at the national convention. If all or most of Romney's delegates backed McCain, it would give him nearly enough to win the nomination, with several large states still yet to vote. Despite these developments, Huckabee vowed to stay in the race. "I may get beat, but I'm not going to quit," he said. A few days later, McCain was endorsed by former President George H. W. Bush, in a move intended to shore up his support among base party elements.

On February 19, McCain continued his winning ways, picking up wins over Huckabee in the Wisconsin primary and the Washington state primary. McCain and Barack Obama engaged in a pointed exchange over Al-Qaeda in Iraq on February 27.

March contests

CNN had cancelled a debate originally scheduled for February 28, saying that McCain was the "presumptive nominee." Mike Huckabee challenged John McCain to a debate before the March 4 primaries, and the Values Voter coalition stepped in, arranging for a debate hall and inviting both McCain and Huckabee, as well as Rep. Ron Paul to participate in a March 3 debate event. After Governor Huckabee had accepted the invitation, Senator McCain said that he had a prior commitment and begged off. Huckabee had previous success with rural and Evangelical Christian voters. Huckabee was endorsed by Dr. James Dobson. McCain received an endorsement from Pastor John Hagee (which he later renounced on May 22). On March 4, Super Tuesday 2, McCain managed to win a large number of Evangelical voters along with his usual independent and veteran supporters. John McCain officially clinched the Republican presidential nomination on March 4, 2008, sweeping the primaries in Ohio, Texas, Rhode Island, and Vermont. That night, Mike Huckabee withdrew from the race and endorsed McCain.
President George W. Bush invited Senator McCain to the White House for Bush's endorsement.

Endorsements 

Unlike in the Democratic Party, Republican members of Congress (including Senate members, House members, and non-voting delegates), and state governors are not automatically made delegates to the party's national convention, however their endorsements can hold sway on voters in caucuses and primaries.

Each state's two members of the Republican National Committee, and the party chairs of each U.S. state and the District of Columbia, Puerto Rico, American Samoa, Guam, the U.S. Virgin Islands, and Northern Mariana Islands are the only automatic delegates to the party's national convention. These superdelegates while officially uncommitted, may also publicly endorse a candidate.

Polling

Statewide results

Early primaries and caucuses 

GOP February 5 rule
Under Republican National Committee rules, no state was allowed to hold its 2008 primary before February 5. Five states – Wyoming, New Hampshire, Michigan, South Carolina, and Florida – moved their primaries ahead and were subsequently stripped of one-half of their apportioned delegates by the RNC.
This punishment was eventually the same as Democratic procedures though that party originally decided to strip all delegates from offending states Michigan and Florida before seating half. The Republican rules did not affect Iowa, Maine, Nevada and Louisiana, because those states did not technically choose their delegates until district or state conventions that occurred after February 5. The Iowa county and state conventions were held on March 15 and June 14, 2008, respectively. The Nevada state convention was held on April 26, 2008, but was suspended by party officials before delegates were elected. The executive board of the Nevada Republican Party met on July 25, 2008, and appointed all 34 delegates and 31 alternates. The Louisiana caucuses selected 105 state delegates to the state convention on February 16 in Baton Rouge.

Super Tuesday 
Many states moved the dates of their primaries or caucuses up to February 5 (Super Tuesday). With almost half the nation voting on that date it acted as a quasi-"national primary". This has also been dubbed "Super Duper Tuesday," and "Tsunami Tuesday".

After Super Tuesday

See also 
 Democratic Party presidential primaries, 2008

References